John Bromilow Thomson (born 1 July 1959) is a Church of England bishop. Since 2014, he has been the Bishop of Selby. He was consecrated at York Minster on 3 July 2014 by John Sentamu, Archbishop of York. From 2001 to 2014, he was Director of Ministry in the Diocese of Sheffield and an Honorary Canon of Sheffield Cathedral.

He was made a deacon at Michaelmas 1985 (29 September) and ordained a priest the Petertide following (29 June 1986), both times by David Lunn, Bishop of Sheffield, at Sheffield Cathedral.

References

Living people
Bishops of Selby
1959 births